Antara Banerjee is an Indian film and television actress, who appeared in the film The Shaukeens and the television series Gumrah: End of Innocence.

Personal life
Banerjee, the only daughter of Subrata and Atasi Banerjee, a Bengali couple from Kolkata, came to Mumbai in 2013 to pursue her ambition to become an actress. A kathak dancer for the past 15 years, Banerjee has done several stage shows in Kolkata and has learned classical singing.

Career

Banerjee started her career in television with an appearance in Gumrah: End of Innocence. Later she made her film debut with the 2014 comedy The Shaukeens. 

Her next venture was an episodic role in Life OK crime drama Savdhaan India. 

From 2016 to 2018 she played Pinky Ahlawat in &TV's Badho Bahu. 

Banerjee then made an episodic appearance in Laal Ishq as Kesar. 

That year, she bagged the role of Suman Sharma in Star Plus series Kasautii Zindagii Kay but exited it in 2019 and was replaced by Ritu Chauhan.

In 2019, she joined Colors TV's Kavach 2 portraying Sanjana Jindal.

From 2019 to 2020, Banerjee portrayed Chinki Malhotra in Star Plus's fantasy drama Divya Drishti.

Television

Filmography

References

Actresses from Mumbai
Living people
1992 births